James Wade (born August 15, 1975), known as Coco, is an American-French basketball head coach for the Chicago Sky of the Women's National Basketball Association (WNBA). Wade won the WNBA's Coach of the Year and Executive of the Year awards in 2019 and 2022 respectively, and led the Sky to their first WNBA Championship in 2021. 

Wade was previously an assistant basketball coach for the Minnesota Lynx of the WNBA and for UMMC Ekaterinburg of the Euroleague and Russian Premier Basketball League. He is a former professional basketball player, having played his entire professional career in Europe.

Playing career
From 2001–2004 Wade played in Cambrai, France. In 2004, he made a brief stop at CSK VVS Samara in the Russian Basketball Super League before taking his next contract at Rosalia Noyastar in Santiago de Compostela in the Spanish Adecco Oro.  Directly after his contract in Spain, he revisited Russia. He would sign a contract with CSKA VVS Samara in Superleague B.  In March 2006 Wade finished the season with Costa Urbana Playas in Spain.  In the fall of 2007, Wade went on to play with Usti Nad Labem in the National Basketball League (Czech Republic).  In the spring of 2008,  he went on to play at Nivelles in the Pro B division of Belgium.  For the 2008–2009 season, Wade took his game back to France and signed with Union Carquefou-Sainte Luce Basket.  For the 2009–2010 season, he played for L'Aurore Vitre in France NM2. Wade played for GET Vosges in Epinal, France in France's NM1 division for the 2010–2011 season. He played the 2011–2013 for Castelnau Le Lez Basket in Montpellier, France. He concluded his basketball career playing against U.S Colomiers in Toulouse, France in the French Cup scoring 33 points, 10 assists, and 6 rebounds in an 89–95 victory to conclude a 13-year career in Europe.

Coaching career

In the spring of 2012, Wade accepted a job as a basketball coaching intern with the WNBA's San Antonio Silver Stars. He served mainly as a player development coach, working closely with All-Stars Sophia Young and Danielle Adams. In 2013, he was hired on the full-time staff to serve as an assistant coach.

In April 2013, Wade served as an advance scout for UMMC Ekaterinburg during the Euroleague Final Eight that would see them go on to be crowned Champion of Europe. After the 2013 WNBA season, he took on a role to serve as an assistant coach for BLMA (Basket Lattes Montpellier Agglomeration).

On March 2, 2017, Wade was announced as the new assistant coach for the WNBA's Minnesota Lynx. One month later he would also be named assistant coach of Russian basketball powerhouse UMMC Ekaterinburg. On October 4, 2017 the Minnesota Lynx won a grueling 5-game series and were crowned WNBA champions for the 4th time in 7 years. This was Wade's first WNBA title. Sylvia Fowles was crowned MVP of the Finals following her regular-season WNBA MVP award. Wade had worked closely with Fowles during the 2017 season. On April 22, 2018 UMMC were crowned Euroleague Champions, and that title was followed quickly by a Russian League Championship on May 2, 2018. That made 3 titles in less than 7 months for Wade.

In November 2018, Wade was named head coach and general manager of the Chicago Sky of the WNBA. In his first season with the Sky, he led the team to its first playoff appearance in three years and was named WNBA Coach of the Year. The Sky lost in the second round of the playoffs to the Las Vegas Aces.

In 2021, the Sky would win the WNBA Championship, defeating the Phoenix Mercury three games to one, giving Wade his first title as a coach.

Head coaching record

WNBA

|-
| align="left" |CHI
| align="left" |
|34||20||14|||| align="center". |3rd in East||2||1||1||
| align="center" |Lost in 2nd Round
|-
| align="left" |CHI
| align="left" |
|22||12||10|||| align="center"  |1st in East||1||0||1||
| align="center" |Lost in 1st Round
|-
| align="left" |CHI
| align="left" |
|32||16||16|||| align="center"  |2nd in East||10||8||2||
| align="center" |Won WNBA Finals 
|-
| align="left" |CHI
| align="left" |
|36||26||10|||| align="center"  |1st in East||8||4||4||
| align="center" |Lost in Semifinals 
|-class="sortbottom"
| align="left" |Career
| ||124||74||50|||| ||21||13||8||

Personal life 
Wade has both French and American citizenship, and is also trilingual (English, French, and Spanish). He is married to Edwige Lawson-Wade, an Olympic silver medalist and professional basketball player. They have a son, James "Jet" Wade III.  On February 2, 2021 on TNT, retired NBA player Dwyane Wade stated that he and James are cousins.

External links
Eurobasket player profile

References 

1975 births
Living people
American expatriate basketball people in the Czech Republic
American expatriate basketball people in France
American expatriate basketball people in Russia
American expatriate basketball people in Spain
American men's basketball players
American women's basketball coaches
Basketball coaches from Tennessee
Basketball players from Memphis, Tennessee
BC Samara players
Chicago Sky coaches
GET Vosges players
Guards (basketball)
Junior college men's basketball players in the United States
Kennesaw State Owls men's basketball players
Middle Tennessee Blue Raiders men's basketball players
Minnesota Lynx coaches
Place of birth missing (living people)
San Antonio Stars coaches
Sluneta Ústí nad Labem players
Sportspeople from Memphis, Tennessee
Women's National Basketball Association championship-winning head coaches
Women's National Basketball Association general managers